The 2014 Houston Texans season was the franchise's 13th season in the National Football League and the first under head coach Bill O'Brien. Despite missing the playoffs for the second season in a row, the Texans greatly improved upon their 2–14 record from 2013, finishing 9–7. As of 2021, this represents the greatest single-season turnaround for the Texans.

Offseason

Draft

Draft trades
 The Texans traded their original fourth- (No. 101 overall) and fifth- (No. 141 overall) round selections to the Philadelphia Eagles in exchange for the Eagles' third-round selection (No. 83 overall).
 The Texans acquired this sixth-round selection (No. 181 overall) in a trade that sent quarterback Matt Schaub to the Oakland Raiders.

Staff

Final roster

Schedule

Preseason

Regular season

Note: Intra-division opponents are in bold text.

Game summaries

Week 1: vs. Washington Redskins
 
After going 2–14 in the previous season, the Texans were looking to secure a win against the Redskins. Following a slow 1st quarter, Washington got on the board first with their only scoring play of the game in the 2nd quarter. D. Young rushed for 1 yard for a touchdown, but K. Forbath's extra point was blocked. With the score, Washington led 6–0 with 6:11 left in the 2nd. Houston quickly responded with a Fitzpatrick 76 yard pass to Hopkins; with the extra point from Bullock, the Texans lead 7–6 with 4:28 left in the 2nd. The Texans kicked the ball back to the Redskins and forced a 3 and out. On the ensuing punt, Blue blocked the kicked and recovered the ball to score a touchdown. With Bullock's extra point, Houston lead 14–6 with 2:15 left in the 2nd.

Washington received the ball for the 2nd half, but Griffin fumbled the ball at the Houston 14, with J. J. Watt recovering. Houston failed to capitalize on the turnover and punted the ball back to the Redskins. The Texans received the ball at the end of the 3rd quarter before letting the clock run out. With 13:19 left to play, Foster fumbled the ball at the Washington 8. Washington also couldn't capitalize on their turnover following numerous rushing plays that resulted in 4th and 17. After receiving the ball again, Houston "chewed up" a lot of clock starting at 8:27 left to play. Following the 2 minute warning, Bullock kicked a 42-yard field goal to extend the Texans' lead to 17–6. The Redskins failed to score on their next possession, giving Houston the ball back with 1:14 left.

Game notes
With the win, the Texans started their season 1–0 and snapped their franchise-worst 14-game losing streak. This was the first regular season game with Bill O'Brien as the Texans' head coach.

Week 2: at Oakland Raiders

The Texans received the ball first and started at their 20 following a touchback. Fitzpatrick connected to Foster for 41 yards for a touchdown. Following the official review, Foster was ruled out at the Oakland 1. On the following play Fitzpatrick connected with Watt (who was in as a tight end) for a touchdown, with Bullock's extra point good. The Texans scored first and lead the Raiders 7–0 with 9:41 left in the first. After the Raiders received the ball they were forced into a 3 and out, punting the ball back to Houston. The Texans managed to score on their next possession, eating up much of the clock in the process. With 0:05 left in the 1st, Houston lead Oakland 14–0.

The Raiders started the 2nd quarter with the ball following Houston's score late in the 1st. Oakland managed to get down to the Houston 31 before Carr's pass was intercepted by Jackson, who returned it for 65 yards to the Oakland 24. After an offensive holding penalty, the Texans were forced into a 2nd and 19, running for 4 yards for a 3rd and 15, before Fitzpatrick's pass fell short to Foster. On 4th and 15, Bullock kicked a 33-yard field goal to give the Texans a 17–0 lead with 10:34 left in the 2nd. The rest of the half went by quietly, with both teams failing to convert a 1st down. At the half, Houston was up 17–0.

Oakland received the ball to start the 2nd half, managing to get down to the Houston 38. Swearinger fumbled the ball (twice) before it was picked up by Joseph and returned for 49 yards to the Oakland 21. The Texans again capitalized on the turnover, this time getting a touchdown following a Fitzpatrick pass to Hopkins. Houston lead 24–0 with 8:34 left in the 3rd. After Oakland received the ball back they were hit with a 10-yard penalty, forcing a 2nd and 20. Oakland failed to get over the penalty, punting the ball on 4th and 14. Houston scored on yet another possession, with a 39-yard Bullock field goal, giving the Texans a 27–0 lead. After the Raiders got the ball back, the marched down the field to the Houston 39, before the end of the 3rd. With Oakland still yet to score, Houston lead 27–0.

Oakland's drive stayed alive after they converted on a 4th and 1. Another "saving grace" came after a defensive holding penalty for 10 yards gave the Raiders a 1st down. McFadden's 1 yard run finally put Oakland on the board, trailing 7–27 with 14:07 left to play. The Raiders kicked the ball back to the Texans, who ate up as much clock as possible with numerous running plays. Houston ended their drive with a 46-yard field goal from Bullock, giving them a 30–7 lead. On Oakland's next possession, Carr's pass was intercepted by Reed at the Oakland 15 and ran it to the 11. Going into a 4th and 8, Bullock attempted a 27-yard field goal, but it was blocked. Following the blocked kick, the Raiders started at their 17 before getting another touchdown to trail 14–30 with 0:14 left. Oakland attempted an onside kick, but went out of bounds, but two offsetting penalties gave the Raiders another chance. On the second attempt, the Texans recovered the ball to win the game 30–14.

Game notes
With the win, the Texans started a season 2–0 for the fifth year in a row and matched their win total from the 2013 season. This was the only game of the 2014 season where the Texans scored in the 1st quarter until week 7 against the Steelers.

Week 3: at New York Giants

In what would become typical for the Texans' 2014 season, the offense was relatively quiet, not scoring at all in the first half. The Giants would lead 14–0 at the end of the half. The offensive problems for Houston would continue into the 2nd half, with a couple of turnovers that occurred. Unable to comeback, the Texans fell 17–30 to the Giants.

Game notes
Not only was the first game of the season Houston lost (2-1), but it was also the first game the New York Giants won (1-2).

Week 4: vs. Buffalo Bills

After the Bills took a lead of 10–0 in the 2nd quarter, the Texans scored 20 unanswered points to put them ahead 20–10. The Bills scored a touchdown to trail 17–20 in the 4th quarter, but Houston responded with a field goal from Bullock in the 4th to put it away, winning the game 23–17.

Game notes
This was the first time Texans quarterback Ryan Fitzpatrick faced his former team since being cut in 2013. With the win, the Texans went 3-1 and surpassed their win total from the previous season.

Week 5: at Dallas Cowboys

Looking to keep up their win streak, the Texans traveled to Dallas for the battle for the Governor's Cup against the Dallas Cowboys. The only score of the first half came from a 33-yard Dan Bailey field goal with 0:16 left in the 2nd quarter. Houston scored with 8:56 left in the 3rd on an Arian Foster 15 yard run, leading 7–3. Dallas answered back with a 43-yard pass from Romo to Williams for a touchdown. After both teams forced a 3 and out, Dallas scored again to lead 17–7 with 9:50 left in the 4th. Houston answered back with a 29-yard field goal from Bullock with 2:31 left to trail 10–17. Dallas was penalized for a delay of game following a Houston timeout which lead to 4th down and 16. Following the penalty, the Texans got the ball back before tying the game with 0:41 left in regulation. Following a timeout called by both teams, Bailey's 53 yard field goal was no good, sending the game into overtime.

Houston received the ball first, but was forced to punt the ball back from the Dallas 48. Dallas won the game following a Dan Bailey 49 yard field goal.

Game notes
In a historic game between the two Texas teams, both the Texans and Cowboys boasted a winning record (3-1) for the first time while meeting. With the win, Dallas leads the regular season series 3–1. The only time the Texans beat the Cowboys during the regular season was during the 2002 season, which was also the franchise's first win.

Week 6: vs. Indianapolis Colts

Following a tough loss in overtime in Dallas, the Texans went home for a Thursday night divisional duel with the Indianapolis Colts. Houston received the ball first, but punted the ball on 4th and 5 from their 25. After receiving the ball, the Colts ended their drive with a 27-yard field goal to lead 3–0 with 11:17 left in the 1st. In a surprise move, the Colts did an onside kick and recovered the ball on their 46. Luck threw a 54-yard pass for a touchdown, but the call was reversed as the runner was down. Luck threw another pass, this time for 49 yards, to get up to the Houston 5. Richardson rushed for a touchdown to give the Colts a 10–0 lead over the Texans. On their next 2 possessions, Houston was forced into a 3 and out, with Indianapolis scoring on their next possessions. Following a difficult 1st quarter, the Texans trailed 0-24.

The 2nd quarter seemed to hold more good fortunes for the Texans, as they got a 1st down following a penalty against the Colts on what would have been a field goal attempt. Houston finally scored with a touchdown to trail 7–24 with 9:48 left in the 2nd. Momentum for the Texans continued as Luck's pass was intercepted by Tuggle at the Indianapolis 34, taking it to the 26. Houston wasted no time before capitalizing on the turnover to score a touchdown with 8:28 left to trail 14–24. The Colts ate up the clock on their next possession, before kick a 34-yard field goal with 1:09 left to lead 27–14. Things seemed to turn against Houston again on their next possession as Fitzpatrick was sacked and they failed to complete 1st down conversion on 4th and 9 with 0:03 left in the 2nd. At halftime, the Texans were trailing 14–27.

The 3rd quarter started out quietly for both teams before Houston scored a touchdown with 6:03 left, to trail 21–27. The Colts scored on their next possession and failed on a two-point conversion to lead 33–21. With Houston trying to get ahead, they ended the 3rd quarter at the Indianapolis 24, trailing 21–33.

With 14:23 left to play, Bullock missed a 37-yard field goal that went wide right. After a Colts fumble, Watt returned it for 45 yards for a touchdown. Watt's fumble return helped keep hopes of a comeback alive for the Texans, as they now trailed 28–33. The Houston defense held off the Indianapolis offense, who were forced to punt the ball back. The Texans could not manage a comeback as they fumbled the ball on each of their next 2 possessions. The Texans fell to the Colts, 28–33, dropped to 2nd place in the AFC South and dropped to 3-3.

Game notes
The 24 point deficit at the end of the 1st quarter is one of the largest in Texans history. This is the fourth time in a row that the Colts have won against the Texans.

Week 7: at Pittsburgh Steelers

After falling to the Colts at home, the Texans visited Pittsburgh for the first time since 2008, doing battle on Monday night with the Pittsburgh Steelers. While the Texans defense held off the Steelers' offense, the offense managed to gain much-needed momentum in the 1st quarter, a place they had previously struggled. The Texans scored first with 5:55 left after Blue caught a pass from Fitzpatrick to lead 7–0. In the second quarter Ben Roethlisberger was sacked by Watt and fumbled the ball near midfield. Houston capitalized on the turnover with a Bullock 39 yard field goal to lead 10–0 with 13:39 left in the 2nd. Houston continued their trend of scoring on each possession with another Bullock field goal (38 yards) to extend their lead to 13–0 with 7:20 left; part of the same drive included the Texans converting on a 4th down and inches. The Steelers finally managed to get on the board with a 44-yard field goal from Shaun Suisham to trail 3–13 with 3:13 left. After forcing a 3 and out for the Texans, the Steelers struck back with a 35-yard touchdown pass from Roerhlisberger to Bryant to trail 10–13 with 1:27 left. After a Houston fumble at their 4-yard line, Pittsburgh took their first lead of the night to lead 17–13 with 1:03 remaining. The Steelers scored off of another Texans turnover after a Fitzpatrick pass was deflected to extend their lead with 0:14 left in the half. Following a series of Houston turnovers in arguably the worst-played three minutes in NFL history, Pittsburgh lead 24–13 at the half. After Suisham made two fourth quarter field goals, from 30 yards (27-16) and 40 yards (30-16), respectively, The Texans tried to rally for the remainder of the game with a Foster TD catch to make it 30–23, and almost pulled off an onside kick recovery, but Pittsburgh managed to avoid a disaster.

Game notes
This was the first game since week 2 against the Raiders that the Texans scored in the 1st quarter. However, with their 3rd straight loss, the Texans fell to 3–4.

Week 8: at Tennessee Titans

In yet another game where Houston did not score in the 1st quarter, the Titans took an early lead with a 35-yard field goal from Brinkley to lead 3–0 with 10:28 left. The Texans got their first scoring play of the day with a Bullock 30 yard field goal to tie the game 3–3 with 7:41 left in the 2nd. Following a three-and-out for Tennessee with 2 penalties (one on the punt), Houston wasted no time to score the game's first touchdown following a 34-yard rush from Foster to lead 10–3 with 6:12 left in the half. Bullock kicked a 29-yard field goal to extend the Texans' lead to 13-3 going into halftime.

The Titans received the ball to start off the 2nd half, but Mettenberger was sacked and fumbled the ball and was recovered by Watt. Houston quickly capitalized on the turnover with a 5-yard pass from Fitzpatrick to Foster to lead 20–3 with 12:39 left in the 3rd. The Texans scored on their next possession to lead 27–3 with 5:47 left in the 3rd. The Titans scored their first touchdown of the game on their next possession with a 6-yard pass from Mettenberger to Walker. With a failed two-point conversion, Tennessee trailed 9–27 with 2:17 left in the third. On the Houston's 3rd play of the 4th quarter, Bullock kicked a 49-yard field goal to extend the lead to 30–9 with 14:17 left to play. The Titans scored a touchdown with 1:02 left to trail 30–16. Blue recovered the onside kick, with Fitzpatrick taking a kneel on the next 2 plays to end the game.

Game notes
With the win, the Texans went to 4–4, snapped their three-game losing streak and held onto 2nd place in the AFC South.

Week 9: vs. Philadelphia Eagles
Battle Red Day

This would be the first time since 2003 that the Texans would wear their Battle Red uniforms against an NFC team. After falling to the Eagles, the Texans entered their bye 4–5. It was later announced that starting quarterback Ryan Fitzpatrick would be benched in favor of Ryan Mallett.

Week 11: at Cleveland Browns

Coming off of their bye week, the Texans faced the Cleveland Browns on the road in Ryan Mallett's first career start. Mallett passed for his first career touchdown to J. J. Watt to give the Texans an early 7–0 lead. Cleveland scored in the 2nd quarter to tie the game 7-7, which would be their only score of the entire game. Houston scored the last touchdown of the game after Mallett connected with Garrett Graham to lead 14-7 going into halftime. The Texans' defense completely shutout the Browns during the second half, while Houston's only scores came from 3 Randy Bullock field goals.

Following the win, the Texans went to 5-5 and started 1-0 under Mallett.

Week 12: vs. Cincinnati Bengals

The Texans fell to Andy Dalton for the first time. With the loss, the Texans fell to 5–6.

Week 13: vs. Tennessee Titans

Following Ryan Mallett's injury the previous week against the Bengals, Ryan Fitzpatrick started for the first time since week 9 against the Eagles. Fitzpatrick had a career day, throwing for 6 touchdown passes to five different receivers in the Texans' 45–21 win, a franchise record. The Texans improved to 6-6 and their 45 points were the most in franchise history until Week 4 of the 2017 season, when they again defeated the Titans 57–14.

Week 14: at Jacksonville Jaguars

With the win, the Texans improved to 7–6.

Week 15: at Indianapolis Colts

The Texans came into Lucas Oil looking to make history by beating the Colts for the first time on their home field. The Texans scored first after K. Lewis intercepted a pass to return it 27 yards for a touchdown. The Colts scored 14 unanswered points in the 2nd quarter to give them a halftime lead of 14–7. Ryan Fitzpatrick was injured in the 3rd quarter, with 3rd string quarterback Tom Savage stepping in for what would be his first NFL game. Early in the 4th, the Texans would go for it on 4th and 1, with Foster running 25 yards for a touchdown. However, the play was called back following an offensive holding penalty. Bullock would kick a 53-yard field goal instead to trail 10–14 with 13:45 left to play. The Colts lead 17–10 with 2:15 left to play following a 29-yard field goal. Houston tried to make a comeback, but Savage's pass was intercepted with 1:34 left. Following the loss, the Texans dropped to 7-7 and the Colts clinched the AFC South title.

Week 16: vs. Baltimore Ravens

With their loss against the Colts mathematically eliminating the Texans from the AFC South title, the Texans returned home in hopes of securing a wild card spot in the playoffs. In his first career start since the 2013 season, Case Keenum started as the team's 4th quarterback of the season. Despite driving into the redzone on their first possession, the Texans instead settled on a field goal for an early 3–0 lead. Houston kicked two more field goals before scoring a touchdown (thrown by Arian Foster) to take a halftime lead of 16–0. The Texans held on to win 25–13, keeping their playoff hopes alive.

Game notes
Andre Johnson had six receptions for 65 yards in the game and became the 10th player in NFL history to reach 1,000 career receptions (1,002). Johnson passed Hines Ward for ninth-most in NFL history. Kicker Randy Bullock was 6/6 on field goals during the game, for a total of 19 points.

Week 17: vs. Jacksonville Jaguars

Notably, J. J. Watt becomes the first NFL player to have 2 20-sack seasons, sacking Blake Bortles in the end zone for his first career safety. With the win, despite being eliminated from the playoffs with the Ravens win over the Browns, the Texans finished the season with the largest win increase of 2014 (+7), with a record of 9–7.

Standings

Division

Conference

Statistics

Team

Individual

Source:

References

External links
 
 2014 Houston Texans season at ESPN

Houston
Houston Texans seasons